"Vi maler byen rød" ("We're painting the town red") was the  entry in the Eurovision Song Contest 1989, written by Søren Bundgaard (music) and Keld Heick (lyrics) and performed in Danish by Birthe Kjær. The English version of the song is called "I'm Chasing Butterflies".

The song was performed twelfth on the night, following 's Park Café with "Monsieur" and preceding 's Thomas Forstner with "Nur ein Lied". At the close of voting, it had received 111 points, placing 3rd in a field of 22. It was succeeded as Danish representative at the 1990 Contest by Lonnie Devantier with "Hallo Hallo", with lyrics also by Keld Heick.

The song qualified as the Danish entry into the Eurovision Song Contest by the usual means of winning that year's Dansk Melodi Grand Prix. All of the contributors were Dansk Melodi Grand Prix regulars – although for Kjær it was the first, and only, time to win after three unsuccessful attempts, Keld Heick had by then authored lyrics to five winning songs, and Søren Bundgaard wrote music and co-performed three of them, although with another female vocalist, Kirsten Siggaard, as part of the duo Hot Eyes. Heick also authored the lyrics to three 1990s Danish entries, and entered the Dansk Melodi Grand Prix numerous times from 1970s to 1990s as both lyricist, composer and performer (with his wife Hilda), while Søren Bundgaard also tried his luck as composer a few other times, including two unsuccessful Hot Eyes entries.

"Vi maler byen rød" is an evocation of good times, with Kjær describing the fun that can be had by "painting the town red". Musically, it is something of a throwback to an earlier time as well, sounding like a more unabashed vocal performance than the more modern numbers starting to achieve success at the contest at the time. It is also memorable for the fact that Kjær was one of the older contestants to have performed in many years. The performance was unique for the fact that not only the song's author, but also the conductor, Henrik Krogsgaard (also a Eurovision regular), joined Kjær on stage as backup singers and dancers. Krogsgaard was "invited" by Kjær to join her by a gesture referring to the song's lyrics, which he promptly did leaving the orchestra to be conducted by the host country's backup conductor, Benoît Kaufman, to the surprise of the TV viewers.

The song has become known as one of the stronger Danish entries, and Birthe Kjær herself was originally slated to perform it as part of a medley of favourites at the Congratulations special in late 2005, but had to withdraw due to ill health. Her place was taken by Tomas Thordarsson (from the 2004 contest) and the song was still greeted enthusiastically.

In 2009 it was announced that the song would be used as the title for the Danish musical Vi maler byen rød: The Musical. The show (written by Rasmus Mansachs) played in Copenhagen, Denmark in April 2010 and was based on and filled with more than 20 of the biggest Danish Eurovision Song from the 1950s up to the present. Birthe Kjær herself was in the audience in the premiere weekend. The show gained cult status long before its premiere, becoming the most "liked" Danish play on Facebook ever. Since then, the show has been staged several times around Denmark by different theatre groups and has become one of the most performed musicals of the decade in Denmark, having played all across the country numerous times each year since it first opened. In 2018, the successful musical sequel Vi maler byen rød: The Musical 2 premiered in Copenhagen with more than 30 Danish Eurovision songs that hadn't been featured in the original musical.

External links
Lyrics and English translation

References 

Eurovision songs of Denmark
Danish-language songs
Eurovision songs of 1989
Songs with lyrics by Keld Heick
1989 songs